Gopalla Gramam  is a Tamil-language novel by Ki. Rajanarayanan. A sequel,  Gopallapurathu Makkal , was published in 1989 and won Sahitya Akademi Award in 1991.

Plot

Overview 
Gopalla Gramam discusses the mass exodus of a small village in present day Andhra Pradesh in India, travelling south, eventually finding a place Kovilpatti in Tamil Nadu. The novel includes timelines of Moghul kings in Andhra Pradesh, transition of other kingdoms in southern part of India, the British invasion of India and part of India’s freedom struggle. Ki. Rajanarayanan mentioned about the existence of collection of stories about the exodus in oral traditions of south India. Along the way, the novel shows the formation of modern infrastructure in South India. The novel also shows a rarely documented phenomenon of how the people of India accepted the British rule.

Accolades 
The sequel Gopallapurathu Makkal won the Sahitya Akademi Award in 1991. Writer and literary critic Jeyamohan wrote a detailed critique on Gopalla Gramam and its sequel Gopallapurathu Makkal and considers them as a pioneering  Novel that started a new genre of novels.

Translations 
Gopalla Gramam has been translated into English by a couple of different publishing houses. Vishnupuram USA and M Vijayalakshmi both have translated Gopalla Gramam.

References 

1970 novels
Indian romance novels
Novels first published in serial form
Novels set in Tamil Nadu
Tamil novels